Cincinnati and Hamilton County Public Library (CHPL) is a public library system in the United States. In addition to its main library location in downtown Cincinnati, Ohio, CHPL operates 40 regional and branch locations throughout Hamilton County.

, the CHPL's collection held around 10.5 million volumes, the 13th-largest overall library collection in the U.S. and the 2nd-largest public library collection in the U.S. Its electronic book holdings were nearly six million, the most of any public library in the country.

In 2019, CHPL had an annual circulation of over twenty-one million items, the second highest circulation of any public library in the country. CHPL's various locations had 5,154,502 visitors in 2019.

The library first received Library Journals highest rating of five stars in 2013, and has received the honor every year since. In 2020, it scored second in the nation among libraries with expenditures over US$30 million.

Services
Among CHPL's collections are books, audiobooks, downloadable digital audio and e-books, magazines, newspapers, CDs, videos, DVDs, CD-ROMs, sheet music, slides, microfilm, microfiche, and Braille. It offers free in-building computer access and Wi-Fi, as well as loaning Wi-Fi hotspots for use at home. The system collectively offered over 17,000 free programs in 2019, including classes, lectures, book clubs, performances, storytimes, and much more. In 2019, its staff answered 1.6 million reference questions by phone, online chat, fax, e-mail, post, and in person. The Main Branch is a selective federal depository library.

The library's website provides access to the library catalog, nearly 150 commercial research databases, bestseller lists, staff reading recommendations, and other information resources.

Special needs services provided by CHPL include "talking books" and Braille to the visually impaired, blind, and physically handicapped in 33 Ohio counties; its outreach services include books-by-mail, foreign language materials and bilingual programs, and passport application; its literacy services include GED classes and GED practice testing.

CHPL holds one of the largest genealogical collections in the United States. Online postings include Cincinnati and Norwood, Ohio city directories, Sanborn maps, and yearbooks as well as books relating to local history.

In 2015, the library opened its first MakerSpace at the Main Library downtown, offering button makers, 3D printers, sewing machines, laser engraving, photography equipment, a recording booth, and more. Later that year, branch MakerSpaces also opened at the Reading and St. Bernard locations, and renovations at the Loveland branch in 2016 included opening a fourth MakerSpace.

Special collections 

In addition to its large book collection, the library also has many specialized collections, most of which are housed in the main library. Highlights of special book collections include:
 Adult New Reader/English as a Second Language Collections
 Braille Books
 Contemporary Artists’ Books
 Jean Alva Goldsmith Children's Literature Collection
 Jobs Information Center Collection
 Science Fair Project Collection
 Murray Seasongood Collection of Government, Law and Public Administration
 Online Exhibit of photos of the 1937 Ohio river flood.
 Theological and Religious Collection

History 

CHPL traces its roots to a subscription library that began in 1802. On March 14, 1853, it became the Cincinnati Public Library. Since its founding, the library has occupied several locations, including its current location at Eighth Street and Vine Street.

In 1874 the project of the "Old Main" Public Library was completed at 629 Vine Street with a capacity capable of holding close to 300,000 books. The interior was designed by J.W. McLaughlin and contrasted the bleak exterior of the library, by featuring checkered marble flooring, cast iron book alcoves, skylights and spiral staircases stretching stories high. At the entrance to the library were stone heads of William Shakespeare, John Milton and Benjamin Franklin; the original purpose of the building was going to be an opera house, but that project lost funding. Though the building was considered modern when it was built, with central heating and an elevator, by the 1920s the library had outgrown the building. Books were stacked high and out of reach, with the 19th century ventilation system failing and the paint peeling. By the 1920s talk of demolition became a frequent topic with no resistance or protests; however, various legal and financial issues kept the destruction process from occurring until 1955, when by that time, the old library could not overcome its crowding and neglect. Removing the books from the old library to another location took three weeks. The old library was a build cost of $383,594.53 (around $7 million today) but was sold to Leyman Corp in January 1955 for $100,000 today and officially demolished by June. Today an office building and a parking garage can be found in the old library's location. A few blocks down Vine Street was the location for a more modern and updated library. The three busts that once guarded the main entrance of the old library were the only original features of the building that were saved and placed in the new library's garden. This library is the Cincinnati and Hamilton County Public Library

Cincinnati's public library was among the first to try providing service to patrons on Sunday. Starting in March 1871, the reading rooms at the main library were open from 8am to 10pm. Sunday library service was so popular that, according to library director William F. Poole, "often during the afternoon and evenings every seat has been occupied". As a result of Cincinnati's experiment, the public libraries in New York, Philadelphia, and St. Louis adopted Sunday hours as well. Poole reported that "many of that class of young men who [had previously] strolled about the streets on Sunday, and spent the day in a less profitable manner, [began] habitually frequenting the rooms and spending a portion of the day in reading."

Beginning in the early 1990s, the library used the Computerized Information Network for Cincinnati and Hamilton County (CINCH) as a system-wide library catalog which connected each branch through computer terminals. Users at home accessed the database via TELNET. In 2005, the system was replaced with an integrated library system (ILS) purchased from library automation vendor Sirsi, now SirsiDynix. In 2012, the ILS was again replaced with Sierra, a product from Innovative Interfaces.

Beginning in 2001, budget cuts from the State of Ohio drastically reduced funding for PLCH. In July 2002, the Board of Trustees voted to close branch locations in Deer Park, Elmwood Place, Greenhills and Mount Healthy. The board later backed off on the branch closing plan after a strong negative response from citizens in the affected neighborhoods.

In 2005, the library received the American Library Association's John Cotton Dana Public Relations Award.

In 2005, a state budget plan that cut spending on libraries a further five percent was passed in the Ohio House of Representatives, after being proposed by Ohio governor Bob Taft. The budget prompted the library to distribute flyers and hold rallies in Downtown Cincinnati, calling on the state to repeal the proposed cuts. The cuts resulted in a periodic hiring freeze, reductions in hours, branch and department closings, and the layoff of approximately forty librarians. Librarians responded by voting to join the Service Employees International Union (SEIU) Local 1199 in 2006.

After nine months of contentious negotiations over a union contract, the parties (SEIU and the library administration) resorted to a hearing in front of a third-party neutral negotiator, who drew up a labor contract.  Librarians voted 45–1 to approve the contract.  The library's Board of Trustees subsequently voted the contract down by a 7–0 vote, citing concerns over 'fair share' proposals built into the contract.  After further negotiations between SEIU and attorneys for the library, the Board approved a union contract that did not include fair share.  See the Agency shop article for clarification.

In 2007, the library began implementing a reorganization plan, known as ML/21 (Main Library for the 21st Century), to plan the creation of a Technology Center, Teen Center, a Popular Library, and a Local History and Genealogy Department.  The plan also called for the disbanding of subject departments in Art and Music, Literature and Languages, History and Genealogy, Rare Books and Special Collections, Science and Technology, Government and Business, Education and Religion, Fiction and Young Adults, and Films and Recordings.  The latter two departments were planned to be incorporated into a new Popular Library. The History and Genealogy Department were planned to be merged with Rare Books and Special Collections to create the  Local History and Genealogy department.  The other subject departments were planned to be merged into the Information and Reference department.  Approximately 24 professional positions (those holding a Master of Library and Information Science) were slated for elimination through attrition and reassignment.

From July 2007 to mid 2008, the library joined with Kirtas Technologies, Inc. to digitize rare books and make them available via Amazon.com. The library no longer participates in the program, but profits from sales of the digitized books were shared with the library. Other institutions involved in the plan included the University of Maine, Emory University in Atlanta, and the Toronto Public Library in Ontario. Digitized material, including books, maps, yearbooks, and city directories, are available via Cincinnati and Hamilton County Public Library's Virtual Library.

In 2019, the library launched a multi-year improvement project called "Building the Next Generation Library." The project planned for facility improvements across the system depending on the needs of communities and facilities. Listening sessions were held for community members at each branch throughout 2019, and the Facility Master Plan documents outlined the recommended work to be done over the next 10 years. Part of the Next Generation Library initiative included a website and brand update in 2020, with the library moving to a BiblioCommons-based website and revealing new logos, brand colors, and the rearranged organization name from The Public Library of Cincinnati and Hamilton County (PLCH) to Cincinnati and Hamilton County Public Library (CHPL). Some priorities were modified due to the 2020 COVID-19 pandemic.

Directors
Fifteen individuals have served as directors of Cincinnati and Hamilton County Public Library:

  John D. Caldwell (1855–1857)
  N. Peabody Poor (1857–1866)
  Lewis Freeman (1866–1869)
  William Frederick Poole (1869–1873)
  Thomas Vickers (1874–1879)
  Chester W. Merrill (1880–1886)
  Albert W. Whelpley (1886–1900)
  Nathaniel D.C. Hodges (1900–1924)
  Chalmers Hadley (1924–1945)
  Carl Vitz (1946–1955)
  Ernest I. Miller (1955–1971)
  James R. Hunt (1971–1991)
  Robert D. Stonestreet (1991–1998)
 Kimber L. Fender (1999–2018)
 Paula Brehm-Heeger (2018–present)

List of branches 
CHPL has 40 branch locations, in addition to the main library downtown:

 Anderson Branch
 Avondale Branch*
 Blue Ash Branch (formerly the Sycamore Branch)
 Bond Hill Branch
 Cheviot Branch
 Clifton Branch
 College Hill Branch (formerly the Northern Hills Branch)
 Corryville Branch* (formerly the North Cincinnati Branch)
 Covedale Branch
 Deer Park Branch
 Delhi Township Branch
 Elmwood Place Branch
 Forest Park Branch (formerly the Parkdale Branch)
 Green Township Regional Branch
 Greenhills Branch
 Groesbeck Branch
 Harrison Branch
 Hyde Park Branch*
 Loveland Branch
 Madeira Branch (formerly the Madeira–Indian Hill Regional Branch)
 Madisonville Branch
 Mariemont Branch
 Miami Township Branch (originally the Cleves Branch)
 Monfort Heights Branch (formerly the West Fork Branch)
 Mt. Healthy Branch
 Mt. Washington Branch
 North Central Branch
 Northside Branch* (formerly the Cumminsville Branch)
 Norwood Branch*
 Oakley Branch
 Pleasant Ridge Branch
 Price Hill Branch*
 Reading Branch (formerly the Valley Branch)
 St. Bernard Branch
 Sharonville Branch
 Symmes Township Regional Branch
 Walnut Hills Branch*
 West End Branch (formerly the Lincoln Park Branch)
 Westwood Branch
 Wyoming Branch (formerly the Bonham Branch)

Locations marked with asterisks were built as Carnegie libraries.

See also
John Reily, one of the original subscribers
The Public, a 2018 film set in the library's Main branch

References

External links

Cincinnati and Hamilton County Public Library
CHPL online catalog
Kids & Families – library landing page for children
Teens – library landing page for teenagers
Friends of the Public Library 
Rearranging the books Citybeat article on 2007 library reorganization plan
the Next Generation Library Library's webpage on 2019 Facilities Master Plan and related projects
Cincinnati Panorama of 1848 The library holds a rare daguerreotype of the buildings along the Ohio River in 1848.

Cincinnati and Hamilton County, Public Library of
Organizations established in 1853
Libraries established in the 1850s
1853 establishments in Ohio
Cincinnati and Hamilton County, Public Library of
Cincinnati and Hamilton County, Public Library of
Education in Cincinnati
Non-profit organizations based in Cincinnati